The men's 400 metres hurdles event at the 2007 Pan American Games was held on July 25–27.

Medalists

Results

Heats
Qualification: First 2 of each heat (Q) and the next 2 fastest (q) qualified for the final.

Final

References
Official results

400
2007